Lepidogma melanobasis is a species of snout moth in the genus Lepidogma. It was described by George Hampson in 1906 and is known from Japan, Taiwan and China.

The wingspan is 18–21 mm.

References

Moths described in 1906
Epipaschiinae
Moths of Japan